Yann Mabella (born 22 February 1996) is a professional footballer who plays for Racing FC Union Luxembourg as a forward. Born in France, he represents the Republic of the Congo national team.

Career
Mabella made his senior debut with AS Nancy in the 1–1 draw with Tours on 27 February 2015, coming on as a substitute for Alexis Busin.

On 31 January 2019, the last day of the 2018–19 winter transfer window, Mabella left Nancy to join Championnat National side Tours FC.

International career
Mabella was born in France to Congolese parents, and was called up to the Congo U23s in 2015. He represented the senior Republic of the Congo national team in a friendly 1–0 win over Niger on 10 June 2021.

Career statistics

References

External links
 
 Yann Mabella at foot-national.com
 
 

1996 births
Living people
Footballers from Toulouse
Republic of the Congo footballers
Republic of the Congo international footballers
French footballers
French sportspeople of Republic of the Congo descent
Association football forwards
AS Nancy Lorraine players
LB Châteauroux players
Tours FC players
Ligue 2 players
Championnat National players
Championnat National 3 players
Luxembourg National Division players
Republic of the Congo expatriate footballers
French expatriate footballers
Republic of the Congo expatriate sportspeople in Luxembourg
French expatriate sportspeople in Luxembourg
Expatriate footballers in Luxembourg
Black French sportspeople